Caspase 14 is an enzyme that in humans is encoded by the CASP14 gene.

The CASP14 gene encodes a member of the cysteine-aspartic acid protease (caspase) family. Sequential activation of caspases plays a central role in the execution-phase of cell apoptosis. Caspases exist as inactive proenzymes which undergo proteolytic processing at conserved aspartic residues to produce two subunits, large and small, that dimerize to form the active enzyme. This caspase has been shown to be processed and activated by caspase 8 and caspase 10 in vitro, and by anti-Fas agonist antibody or TNF-related apoptosis inducing ligand in vivo. The expression and processing of this caspase may be involved in keratinocyte terminal differentiation, which is important for the formation of the skin barrier.

According to the Human Protein Atlas, the CASP14 protein is enriched human skin and mainly expressed in the upper layers of the epidermis. The protein is mainly localised to the cytosol according to the Cell Atlas.

See also
 The Proteolysis Map
 Caspase

References

Further reading

External links
 The MEROPS online database for peptidases and their inhibitors: C14.018

Caspases